The 2017 Santiago Challenger was a professional tennis tournament played on clay courts. It was the third edition of the tournament which was part of the 2017 ATP Challenger Tour. It took place in Santiago, Chile between 13 and 18 November 2017.

Singles main-draw entrants

Seeds

 1 Rankings are as of 6 November 2017.

Other entrants
The following players received wildcards into the singles main draw:
  José Hernández-Fernández
  Gonzalo Lama
  Javier Naser
  Juan Carlos Sáez

The following players received entry from the qualifying draw:
  Roberto Carballés Baena
  Patricio Heras
  Dimitar Kuzmanov
  Pedro Sakamoto

Champions

Singles

  Nicolás Jarry def.  Marcelo Arévalo 6–1, 7–5.

Doubles

  Franco Agamenone /  Facundo Argüello def.  Máximo González /  Nicolás Jarry 6–4, 3–6, [10–6].

References

2017 ATP Challenger Tour